"Lady" is a song recorded by American country music artist Brett Young. It was released on April 30, 2020 as the lead single from his third studio album, Weekends Look a Little Different These Days, which was released on June 4, 2021. The song written by Young, along with Jon Nite and Ross Copperman.

Background
"Lady" is a song for Young's daughter, Presley Elizabeth, but it's also for Young's wife Taylor Mills.
Young said: ""Lady" is maybe one of the most special songs I've ever written. I knew from the moment that my wife and I even started discussing having children that I was gonna want to write songs for my kid. I thought for sure it would after they were born and I got to know them a little bit—something would inspire me".

Music video
The video was uploaded on June 18, 2020, directed by Seth Kupersmith. The video was shot with a camera and a drone and following social distance guidelines.  The family shown getting ready for a day at the beach and in the same cabana Young filmed his solo scenes. The trio also heads to the pool, Presley wearing a pair of tiny sunglasses with her swimsuit as she hits the water with her dad, Taylor covering her daughter's head with a floppy hat.

Charts

Weekly charts

Year-end charts

Certifications

References

External links

2020 singles
2020 songs
Brett Young (singer) songs
Songs written by Ross Copperman
Songs written by Jon Nite
Songs written by Brett Young (singer)
Song recordings produced by Dann Huff
Big Machine Records singles